Naya Kanoon is a 1965 Indian Hindi-language film, written and directed by R. C. Talwar. The film stars Ashok Kumar, Bharat Bhushan and Vyjayanthimala in the lead with Om Prakash, Badri Prasad, Leela Mishra, Kamal Mehra, Purnima and Nishi appearing in other significant roles.

The film deals with the law and the justice with a family backdrop. The story revolves around Jyoti's (Vyjayanthimala) relationship with her brother, Shekhar (Ashok Kumar) and husband, Deepak (Bharat Bhushan).

Plot
Deepak (Bharat Bhushan) lives as a tenant in a small room, owned by his landlord Om Prakash Munshi (Om Prakash). Although he is a poet, he is unable to secure any employment. One day, he meets with Jyoti (Vyjayanthimala) and both fall in love. After their marriage, there is considerable resentment, and Jyoti's brother, Shekar (Ashok Kumar) refuses to have to do anything with Jyoti. When Shekar offers money to Deepak, Deepak refuses to accept it. Shekar and Jyoti's dad, Daya Shankar (Badri Prasad) sympathises with Jyoti and wants her to be the sole heir to his property after his death. In the meantime, Om Prakash marries his son to a wealthy woman, who does bring in a lot of dowry, but refuses to do any household work, and instead puts her father-in-law to work. As Deepak is unable to get employment, Jyoti is successful in getting employment as a singer on the local radio station, not knowing that Deepak is resentful of her success, and is thinking of separating from her.

Cast
 Ashok Kumar as Shekhar 
 Bharat Bhushan as Deepak
 Vyjayanthimala as Jyoti 
 Om Prakash as Om Prakash Munshi
 Badri Prasad as Dayashankar
 Leela Mishra as Maid
 Nishi
 Purnima as Geeta

Soundtrack

The film's soundtrack was composed by Madan Mohan in 1964. The playback voices were lent by Asha Bhosle and Mohammed Rafi.

All lyrics written by Hasrat Jaipuri, except where noted.

 The Rakhi song of this film lyrics by Saraswati Kumar Deepak.

References

External links
 
 Naya Kanoon profile at Upperstall.com

1960s Hindi-language films
Indian romantic drama films
1965 romantic drama films
Indian black-and-white films
Films scored by Madan Mohan
1965 films